Peter Roberts (born 16 February 1952) is an Australian former cricketer. He played six first-class matches for Tasmania between 1970 and 1975.

See also
 List of Tasmanian representative cricketers

References

External links
 

1952 births
Living people
Australian cricketers
Tasmania cricketers
Cricketers from Hobart